Veronique Belleter (born 29 October 1977) is a former Belgian racing cyclist. She won the Belgian national road race title in 2006.

References

External links

1977 births
Living people
Belgian female cyclists
Sportspeople from Sint-Niklaas
Cyclists from East Flanders